Fillmore is an unincorporated community in Fillmore County, Minnesota, United States.

History
Fillmore was founded in 1855. A post office was established at Fillmore in 1855, and remained in operation until 1905.

Notes

Unincorporated communities in Fillmore County, Minnesota
Unincorporated communities in Minnesota